Jack Fleming Eccles  (9 February 1922 – January 2010) was a British trade unionist.

Eccles was born in Heaton Moor and grew up in Chorlton, then studied at the University of Manchester.  During World War II, he served with the 14th Army in Burma.  In 1948, he took employment as an organiser with the National Union of General and Municipal Workers.  His family had a long history in the union, with his grandfather Fleming Eccles and father Tom Eccles both having played leading roles.  Eccles also served as a Labour Party member of Manchester City Council.  In 1966, he became the Lancashire regional secretary of the union.

In 1973, Eccles joined the council of the Trades Union Congress, and in 1980, he was awarded the CBE.  He served as President of the TUC in 1985, during which time he opposed the UK miners strike.  He retired the following year.

References

1922 births
2010 deaths
Alumni of the University of Manchester
British military personnel of World War II
Trade unionists from Greater Manchester
Commanders of the Order of the British Empire
Councillors in Manchester
Labour Party (UK) councillors
Members of the General Council of the Trades Union Congress
People from Heaton Moor
Presidents of the Trades Union Congress
British people in British Burma
Military personnel from Lancashire